Fred Hayes State Park at Starvation (formerly Starvation State Park) is a state park in northeastern Utah, United States, featuring the  Starvation Reservoir.

Facilities

The  Starvation Reservoir is open year-round, and is popular for fishing and boating. Established in 1972, the marina features a 54-unit RV campground along with developed and primitive camping, rental cabins, boat ramp and dock, a sand beach, restrooms, showers, a group-use pavilion, sewage disposal, and fish cleaning stations. Primitive camping is allowed in designated areas around the perimeter of the reservoir for a fee.
OHVs are only allowed at Knight Hollow Campground.  County-owned dirt roads are open (including the road from Knight Hollow to the town of Duchesne) in the nearby area.

History
There are various narratives explaining the name "Starvation". Orson Mott recounted the most credible story. In 1900, A.M. Murdock of Heber city, approached Major Myton of the Uintah Indian reservation to purchase grazing permits for his cattle. He was given grazing permits in the upper Strawberry river area. Dave Murdock, brother of Al Murdock, had secured a contract to provide beef to the Ute tribe at Fort Duchesne. In the fall of 1904 they brought the herd out of the high grazing areas and made it to the river bottoms which is now covered by Starvation reservoir. Very heavy snows stranded the herd. With no feed the entire herd died. Dave Murdock named the area "Starvation Flats" from this experience.

Another account describes a group of fur trappers stranded in harsh winter conditions who survived by stealing a local Native American cache of food, which resulted in their starvation. Another account tells the opposite story, with the Indians doing the stealing and the trappers starving. A third story involves a local rancher who attempted to graze livestock in the area, and they all starved. Yet another explanation for the name involves settlers in the early 1900s trying to survive along the banks of the Strawberry River, in the area now occupied by the reservoir. These settlers dealt with near-starvation in a hostile environment. Winters in the area are long and cold, and their livestock often died. The area's short growing season was hindered by floods, hail, early frost and other problems. These settlers could have nicknamed the area Starvation.

Starvation Dam
The reservoir is fed by the Strawberry River in the Uinta Basin, and is part of the Central Utah Project – Bonneville Unit. It was constructed in 1970.

References

External links

 Official Starvation State Park website

1972 establishments in Utah
State parks of Utah
Protected areas of Duchesne County, Utah
Protected areas established in 1972